Testify is the sixth studio album by American Christian nu metal band P.O.D. It was originally set for a December 2005 release, but was delayed until January 24, 2006 by Atlantic Records. Testify was also their last album with Jason Truby on guitar, before he left the band in December 2006.

Testify was also available in the Testify (Limited Edition) version with a bonus CD (called Beyond Testify) featuring commentary by the band on every song on the album, as well as four bonus songs and a remix that didn't make the album. The album's first single, "Goodbye for Now," went on to become the No. 1 music video on MTV's TRL. The song also enjoyed heavy play on the radio. Testify became the No. 1 selling Christian album on Billboard for several weeks and, as of May 2006, had been in the Top 25 for a total of 16 weeks. It opened at No. 9 on the Billboard 200 with 58,000 scans and has sold over 210,000 copies in the US and over 500,000 copies worldwide.

Musical style and production
Bassist Traa Daniels stated "This album defines who we are musically as a foursome more than any other album that we've ever done." He added, "What we tried to do on this album. . . was to take people on a journey musically. . . I think we have a lot of different elements." Sonny Sandoval also noted, "We have one of the heaviest songs we ever wrote and one of the softest songs we ever wrote."

Critical reception 

Upon release, Testify was met with mixed reception from major music publications. On an aggregate score out of 100, Metacritic gave it 55 based on 11 reviews.
Jason Bracelin of Blender gave the album two stars out of five and proclaimed, "On their fifth disc, these 'jah soldiers' run low on ammo" and elaborated that "on the ska-tinged 'Strength of My Life,' they sound like the world’s most polite rude boys, while 'Goodbye for Now' is the kind of listless modern rock that could be bottled and sold as a sleep aid." Rolling Stones Christian Hoard similarly noted "Testify is not as pompous or overblown as you might think; it just feels tired. . . The most notable aspect of Testify, in fact, is how little P.O.D., or their guitars, have to say."

AllMusic's Matt Collar, however, gave the album 4/5 rating and considered guitarist Jason Truby's work a "truly inspired and technically brilliant performance." He also commended Sandoval's enthusiastic vocals regarded the album as representing "a band reborn".

Track listing 

Beyond Testify is also a limited edition second disc that features exclusive web content, commentaries for all the songs, and the following bonus tracks:

Personnel 
P.O.D.
 Sonny Sandoval – lead vocals
 Jason Truby – guitar, backing vocals on "Mistakes and Glories"
 Traa Daniels – bass guitar
 Wuv Bernardo – drums

Additional personnel
 Jordan Orava – synthesizer
 Glen Ballard – programming, keyboards, production
 Matisyahu – guest vocals on "Roots on Stereo" and "Strength of My Life"
 Katy Perry – background vocals on "Goodbye for Now"

Jonathan Davis was scheduled to perform backup vocals on the song "Mistakes and Glories" but could not be due to scheduling conflicts. Jason Truby recorded the sections left for Davis in his place.

Charts

References

External links

P.O.D. albums
2006 albums
Atlantic Records albums
Albums produced by Glen Ballard